Ernst Lemmer (April 28, 1898 – August 16, 1970) was a German politician of the Christian Democratic Union (CDU) and former member of the German Bundestag.

Life 
Lemmer was a member of the German Bundestag from the increase in the number of Berlin delegates on February 1, 1952 until his death. From November 15, 1956 to October 29, 1957, he was Federal Minister of Posts and Telecommunications in Konrad Adenauer's second cabinet, and then Federal Minister for Pan-German Affairs from October 29, 1957 to December 11, 1962. From 19 February 1964 to 26 October 1965 he was in Ludwig Erhard's first cabinet as Federal Minister for Displaced Persons, Refugees and War-Affected Persons.

Literature

References

1898 births
1970 deaths
Members of the Bundestag for Berlin
Members of the Bundestag 1969–1972
Members of the Bundestag 1965–1969
Members of the Bundestag 1961–1965
Members of the Bundestag 1957–1961
Members of the Bundestag 1953–1957
Members of the Bundestag 1949–1953
Members of the Bundestag for the Christian Democratic Union of Germany
Members of the Abgeordnetenhaus of Berlin
Burials at the Waldfriedhof Zehlendorf